The Devil Is a Part-Timer! (はたらく魔王さま! Hataraku Maō-sama!, literally Working Demon King! or Demon Lord at Work!) is a 2013 fantasy, comedy Japanese anime series based on the light novels written by Satoshi Wagahara. In another dimension, the Dark Lord Satan and his forces of evil are defeated by the Hero Emilia Justina. Satan and his Demon general Alciel are forced to flee through a portal which drops them off in modern-day Japan. With their magic slowly depleting in an unfamiliar world, they are forced to assume the lives of normal human beings in order to survive. The Hero Emilia Justina follows them through the portal and she too is met with the same circumstances. Although Emilia still harbors negative feelings towards Satan for his past acts of evil, they become unlikely allies in order to survive.

The anime is produced by White Fox and directed by Naoto Hosoda, with series composition by Masahiro Yokotani, character designs by Atsushi Ikariya, art direction by Yoshito Takamine and sound direction by Jin Aketagawa. The thirteen episode series premiered between April 4 and June 27, 2013 on Tokyo MX and was later aired on KBS, SUN-TV, BS Nittele, TV Aichi and AT-X. Pony Canyon released the series in Japan on six Blu-ray and DVD volumes starting on July 3, 2013. The anime was acquired by Funimation for streaming in North America. Manga Entertainment later licensed the series for distribution in the United Kingdom. This was followed by an acquisition by Siren Visual for home media distribution in Australia and New Zealand and online streaming on AnimeLab in 2014. Since 2022, the series is now streaming outside of Asia on Crunchyroll, a video streaming service that Funimation's parent company, Sony Pictures Television, acquired from WarnerMedia in 2021, who in turn acquired Funimation in 2018.

A second season was announced at Kadokawa's Light Novel Expo on March 6, 2021, with the main cast reprising their roles. The second season, titled The Devil Is a Part-Timer!!, is animated by 3Hz, with Daisuke Tsukushi directing, Ydai Iino designing the characters, Yoshihiro Takeda serving as chief animation director and the rest of the staff returning from the first season. The second season aired from July 14 to September 29, 2022.

A sequel was announced following the conclusion of the second season. It is set to premiere in 2023.

Series overview

Episode list

Season 1 (2013)

Season 2 (2022)

Notes

References

External links
 Official anime website 

Devil Is a Part-Timer, The
The Devil Is a Part-Timer! episode lists